The Wallace and Glenn Potter House, in Eugene, Oregon, United States, is a house listed on the National Register of Historic Places.

See also
 National Register of Historic Places listings in Lane County, Oregon

References

1928 establishments in Oregon
Houses completed in 1928
Houses on the National Register of Historic Places in Eugene, Oregon
Tudor Revival architecture in Oregon